Leanid Arturavič Zejdel-Volski (born on 14 September 1965 in Minsk), better known as Lavon Volski, is a Belarusian musician, writer, painter, and founder of the Belarusian rock groups Mroja, N.R.M., Zet, and Krambambula.

Biography
Lavon Volski is a Belarusian rock musician, an author of music and lyrics, poet, artist, group leader of N.R.M. and Krambambula, the owner of numerous musical awards, both personal and as a member of various collectives.

Career
He was a vocalist and a keyboard player of the Belarusian Rock-band Mroja. He wrote lyrics for ULIS, album Pa-nad dachami (1995) and was guitar player and the vocalist of Novaje Nieba. Now he is the rhythm guitar player and the vocalist of N.R.M., Zet and Krambambula. In 2008 he has also started a solo career and released a first album called "Bielaja jablynia hromu" in March 2010. For the Belarusian speaking radioprogramme Radio Svaboda he writes sharp-ironical Cabaret-styled songs about political and social topics. In 2014 he released a solo album "Social Science" - an author's view of the problems of modern Belarusian society. 

On the New Year 2019 he acted and directed the musical show “We will be not understood in Moscow” by Tuzin.fm, “Belsat Music Live”, and himself.

Publications
He wrote two books of poetry: Kalidor ("Corridor") (1993) and Fotaalbom ("Photo album") (2000), a prose book Milarus ("Dear + Belarus") (2011)  and writes for Nasha Niva and the Teksty magazine.

Discography

With Mroya (1986-1994)
 Stary chram ("Old Temple")
 Zrok ("Vision")
 Studyja BM ("Studio BM")
 28-ja zorka (“Star 28")

With N.R.M. 
 Lalalala (1995)
 Odzirydzidzina (1996) 
 Pašpart hramadzianina N.R.M. ("Passport of citizen of N.R.M.") (1998)
 Try čarapachi ("Three turtles") (2000)
 Dom kultury ("House of Culture") (2002)
 06 (2007)

With Krambambula 
 Zastolny albom (2002)
 Karali rajonu ("Kings of the District") (2003)
 "Radio "Krambambulya” 0,33FM" (2004)
 Krambambula śviatočnaja ("Krambambulya festive") (2007)
 Drabadzi-drabada (2011)
 Čyrvony štral ("Red Strahl") (2015)

Solo projects 
 Kuplety i prypievy (“Couplets and choruses") (2008)
 Biełaja jabłynia hromu ("White apple tree of thunder") (2010)
 Hramadaznaŭstva (“Social science") (2014)
 Psychasamatyka ("Psychosomatics")(2016)
 Hravitacyja ("Gravity") (2019)
 Ameryka ("America") (2020)
 Trybunał ("Tribunal") (2021)

Collaborative albums 
 Narodny Albom ("People's album") (1997)
 Śviaty Viečar 2000 ("Holy evening 2000") (1999)
 Ja naradziŭsia tut ("I was born here") (2000)
 Takoha niama nidzie ("There is no such thing anywhere") (2010)

Singles and EPs 
 Vive Le Matin! (2010)
 Try čarapachi (2019)

Compilation albums 
 Premjer Tuzin 2005 (2005)
 Premjer Tuzin 2006 (2006)

Miscellanea

Four songs written by Lavon Volski were performed in the 2006 documentary A Lesson of Belarusian, which dealt with the Belarusian democracy movement and the 2006 re-election of Alexander Lukashenko as president. Three of these were performed by N.R.M., the other by Belarusian students.

The song Try čarapachi that he wrote for the namesake album became very populat among Belarusians. It's often performed during opposition protests, among students, and among Belarusians in emigartion.

Soundtracks and arrangements
 Author's broadcast "Kvadrakola" for "Radio "BM" (1992–1994)
 Author's broadcast "Kvadrakola" for "Radio "Racyja" (1998–2002) 
 OST to the feature film "Koler kachannia" ("The Color of Love") (2005)
 Music for the play on the base of the Minsk Theater for Young People ("TJUH") by the play of F. Alehnovich "Pan ministr" ("Pan Minister") (2008) 
 OST the feature film "Dastish fantastish" (2010)
 OST and lyrics to the socio-cultural video "Budzma blarusami" ("We are Belarusians") (2010)
 OST and concept to the socio-political cabaret "Saŭka dy Hryška" in song format for "Radio "Liberty" (2010–2012)
 OST and script to the feature film "Adnojčy ŭ Barachlandyi" (film-tale: "Once upon time in Barahlyandiya") (2010) 
 OST to the feature film "Žyvie Biełaruś" ("Viva Belarus"), the premiere of the film was on May 22, 2012, at the 65th Cannes Film Festival (2012)
 Musical arrangement and script to the historical and humorous program "Nazad u budučyniu" ("Back to the Future") for the Polish-Belarusian TV channel "Belsat" (2012–2014)
 OST and script to the feature film "Byvaj, Ziamla" ("Farewell, Earth!") (2014)
 2014-2018 OST and concept to the socio-political cabaret "Saŭka dy Hryška" in the animated clip format for "Radio "Liberty" (2014–2018)
 The satirical radio program "Aranžavyja akulary" ("Orange glasses") for "Radio "Liberty" (2015)
 Musical arrangement to the concert-musical "Narodny albom" ("Folk Album") for the  "Bialystok Opera" (2016) 
 The song "Namaluj" ("Draw") - the musical part of the project "Kazimir Malevich for children" with the support of The Malevich Society is a private American not-for-profit organization (2017)

Awards

 People's Choice Award at the festival "Rock-step 1988"; winner of "Navapolack 1988" festival (1988)
 Grand Prix in the nomination "The best keyboardist" at the festival "Three Colors 1990" (1990)
 Rock crown in the nomination  "Song of the Year" ("Partisan song") (1996)
 Rock crown in the category "Album of the Year" ("Folk album") (1997)
 Rock crown-1997 in the nomination  “Band of the Year "N.R.M." (1997)
 People's Choice Award (1998)
 Project of the Year ("Holy night 2000") (1999)
 Song of the Year ("The balloon") (1999)
 Musician of the Year (2000)
 Event of the Year (the project "I was born here") (2000) 
 The best lyrics (2000)
 Song of the Year ("Three turtles") (2000)
 Album of the Year ("Three turtles") (2000)
 Rock crown (2000)
 Artist of the Year, Album of the Year and Song of the Year – "Rock-Coronation-2002" (2002)
 Artist of the Year at the "Rock-Coronation 2004–2005" (2004–2005)
 Artist of the Year at the "Rock Coronation 2007" (2007)
 Freemuse Award (2016)

References

External links
 "Private Business" at N.R.M. page
 Lavon Volski's web site
 Site of Krambambula
 Volski's project Savka and Gryshka at Radio Svaboda
 Lavon Volski's blog
 Interview with Lavon Volski

1965 births
Living people
Belarusian rock musicians
Musicians from Minsk
20th-century Belarusian male singers
Belarusian songwriters
Belarusian painters
21st-century Belarusian male singers